{|

{{Infobox ship career
|Hide header=title
|Ship country=Nazi Germany
|Ship flag=
|Ship name=Michel
|Ship renamed=*Bonn (1939)
Michel (1941)
|Ship operator=Kriegsmarine
|Ship christened=
|Ship class=
|Ship reclassified=*Hospital Ship (1939)
Auxiliary cruiser (1941)
|Ship namesake=Deutscher Michel
|Ship nickname=*HSK-9
Schiff-28
Raider H
|Ship ordered=
|Ship builder=
|Ship laid down=
|Ship launched=
|Ship acquired=
|Ship commissioned=7 September 1941
|Ship decommissioned=
|Ship in service=
|Ship out of service=
|Ship struck=
|Ship reinstated=
|Ship honours=
|Ship fate=Sunk on 17 October 1943 by U.S submarine USS Tarpon east of Yokohama
|Ship notes=
}}

|}Michel (HSK-9) was an auxiliary cruiser of Nazi Germany's Kriegsmarine that operated as a merchant raider during World War II. Built by Danziger Werft in Danzig 1938/39 as the freighter Bielsko for the Polish Gdynia-America-Line (GAL), she was requisitioned by the Kriegsmarine at the outbreak of World War II and converted into the hospital ship Bonn. In the summer of 1941, she was converted into the auxiliary cruiser Michel, and was commissioned on 7 September 1941. Known as Schiff 28, her Royal Navy designation was Raider H'''. She was the last operative German raider of World War II.

Construction and conversion
When the auxiliary cruiser Widder returned from her cruise to Germany, her engines were almost worn out. The hospital ship Bonn was converted into an auxiliary cruiser and mounted the weapons used by the Widder.

First raiding voyage
Although Michel was scheduled to leave at the end of November 1941, she was unable to sail until March 1942 because of reconstruction delays. She then moved under heavy escort through the English Channel to a port in occupied France. She set off on her cruise sailed on 20 March 1942,commanded by Fregattenkapitan (later Kapitan zur See) Helmuth von Ruckteschell, the former commander of Hilfskreuzer 3, the raider Widder).Michel grounded on her first attempt to run through the Channel and had to return to port. She managed to reach the Atlantic on 20 March on her second try. On 14 and 15 March, British forces attacked the cruiser and her escorts, but without success. Michel began her operations in the South Atlantic and sank the British tanker Patelle on 19 April. On 22 April her small torpedo boat, LS 4 Esau sank the American tanker Connecticut, but an attack on the faster British freighter Menelaus failed on 1 May. The Royal Navy now sent the heavy cruiser HMS Shropshire and two AMCs to track her down. Nevertheless, Michel sank the Norse freighter Kattegat on 20 May.

LS 4 Esau discovered the struggling US Liberty ship SS George Clymer and scored two torpedo hits, though the freighter did not sink. The nearby British AMC Alcantara rescued her crew, but the ship had to be abandoned. The German ship retreated when the British AMCs came in sight and escaped detection. The British mistakenly presumed the George Clymer had been torpedoed by a submarine. On 2 January 1943 she sank the British freighter Empire March in the southern Atlantic Ocean.  

Other successes followed as Michel crossed the South Atlantic and entered the Indian Ocean. After a successful cruise of eleven and a half months, she arrived in Japan in March 1943, having offloaded the rescued allied sailors at Singapore.

During her 346 days at sea, Michel had intercepted and sunk 15 allied merchant ships, for a total of 98,586 tons (GRT).

Second raiding voyage

After a refit, Michel sailed from Yokohama on her second cruise on 21 May 1943, now under the command of KzS Günther Gumprich, who had previously commanded the Thor.

She sailed along the west coast of Australia and crossed the Pacific Ocean to the coast of South America.

The first prey of Michel was the 7715 GRT Norwegian freighter Høegh Silverdawn, sunk south-east of Cocos Islands (25.40S- 92.00E) on the early hours of 15 June, whilst on a voyage from Fremantle, Australia, to Abadan, Iran, with ammunition and general cargo. A total of 30 crew and 6
passengers were killed. Three survivors were saved after 11 days on a raft. Another 14 survivors arrived at India after 32 days and 3.100 nm in a damaged lifeboat.

The second merchant ship to be sunk by Michel in her second voyage was also Norwegian, the 9940 GRT tanker Ferncastle, which went down the same day that Høegh Silverdawn. The tanker was first torpedoed by Michel's midget motor torpedo boat LS4 Esau, and then shelled by the auxiliary cruiser. A total of 24 seamen died, 18 in the raider's attack and six others aboard one of the tanker's lifeboats before being rescued.

The fate of her last victim, the 9977 GRT Norwegian tanker India, sunk in the southern Pacific on 11 September 1943 with a loss of all hands, would not be known until after the war's end. On 29 August, Michels lookouts had sighted what they identified as a Pensacola-class cruiser. Gumprich ordered a northern course to avoid the powerful enemy warship. The log of the American light cruiser USS Trenton shows that she had a radar contact which lasted for 15 minutes on the previous day. Had the American cruiser investigated, the crew of the India might have been saved.

Fate

Almost within sight of Japan and only  out from port, Michel was spotted by the US submarine Tarpon on 20 October 1943. In one of the few instances of American submarines attacking a German ship during World War II, Tarpon fired a total of eight torpedoes in four successive strikes, of which four torpedoes struck home and detonated - the Mark 14 torpedo having reliability problems. Michel sank, taking down 290 of her crew, including the captain. The 116 survivors reached safety in Japan after a three-day journey in open boats. Scores of others had been left on rafts and floating wreckage, but the Japanese Imperial Navy search aircraft reported they had seen nothing. This caused some friction with the German Navy officers in Japan, who felt the Japanese seemed unconcerned about rescuing possible German survivors. The loss of the Michel marked the end of the cruises of German auxiliary commerce raiders.

Raiding career

First cruise:

 1942-04-19  
 1942-04-22  
 1942-05-20  
 1942-06-07  
 1942-06-11  
 1942-07-15 Gloucester Castle 
 1942-07-16  
 1942-07-17  
 1942-08-14  
 1942-09-10 MS American Leader 
 1942-09-11  
 1942-11-02   
 1942-11-29  
 1942-12-08  
 1943-01-02  

Second cruise:

 1943-06-15  .
 1943-06-17  
 1943-09-11

References

Bibliography

External links
Hilfskreuzer Michel on Bismarck & Tirpitz, with list of all captured ships.

World War II commerce raiders
World War II cruisers of Germany
Ships built in Danzig
World War II shipwrecks in the Pacific Ocean
1939 ships
Ships sunk by American submarines
Auxiliary cruisers of the Kriegsmarine
Germany–Japan relations
Maritime incidents in October 1943